Burnt House is an unincorporated community in Ritchie County, West Virginia, United States. The Burnt House Post Office closed 5/23/1986.

The community's name recalls a tavern which burned at the town site circa 1840.

References

Unincorporated communities in Ritchie County, West Virginia
Unincorporated communities in West Virginia